Goldbeck is a surname. Notable people with the surname include:

Fred Goldbeck (1902–1981), French musicologist and conductor
Johann Friedrich Goldbeck (1748–1812), German geographer and Protestant theologian
Willis Goldbeck (1898–1979), American screenwriter and film director